Great Books of the 20th Century is a series of twenty novels published by Penguin Books.

The following novels are included in the series:

Heart of Darkness by Joseph Conrad (1899–1902)
Swann's Way by Marcel Proust (1913)
The Metamorphosis and Other Stories by Franz Kafka (1915)
The Good Soldier by Ford Madox Ford (1915)
A Portrait of the Artist as a Young Man by James Joyce (1914–16)
My Ántonia by Willa Cather (1918)
Women in Love by D. H. Lawrence (1920)
The Age of Innocence by Edith Wharton (1920)
The Grapes of Wrath by John Steinbeck (1939)
The Heart of the Matter by Graham Greene (1948)
The Adventures of Augie March by Saul Bellow (1953)
Lord of the Flies by William Golding (1954)
On the Road by Jack Kerouac (1957)
One Flew Over the Cuckoo's Nest by Ken Kesey (1962)
Gravity's Rainbow by Thomas Pynchon (1973)
Waiting for the Barbarians by J. M. Coetzee (1980)
Midnight's Children by Salman Rushdie (1981)
White Noise by Don DeLillo (1985)
Love in the Time of Cholera by Gabriel Garcia Marquez (1985)
Beloved by Toni Morrison (1987)

See also

Penguin Essentials
Penguin Red Classics
Ten of the Best

References 

Lists of novels
20th-century novels
Penguin Books book series
Lists of books by imprint or publisher